Helen Dickerson Wise (born September 11, 1928) is a former Democratic member of the Pennsylvania House of Representatives.

Wise earned her Bachelor of Arts, Master of Education, and Doctor of Education degrees at Penn State University with a focus on secondary education. She was employed by the State College School District for twenty years beginning in 1958, teaching at all levels and even instructing secondary education classes at Penn State, where in 1969 alumni elected her to her first term on the Board of Trustees. She served her alma mater as a trustee for twenty-one years, chairing in turn committees on educational policy and affirmative action. She became the president of the Pennsylvania State Education Association in 1969, and then president of the National Education Association in 1973. She later headed the Delaware State Education Association as executive director from 1979 to 1985, and was a member of the steering committee of the governor's Task Force on Education for Economic Growth in Delaware. Recognizing her impact on the quality of education in Delaware, the DSEA established an award to be given annually in her name for distinguished contributions to education. Dr. Wise served in Pennsylvania's House of Representatives from 1976 to 1978, where she chaired the subcommittee on human resources and served on the education, conservation and federal/state relations committees. She was also a member of the educational committee of the National Conference of State Legislatures and sat on the Pennsylvania Higher Education Assistance Agency board. Dr. Wise retired in 1984 from the Delaware post but not from educational leadership, continuing to serve as consultant and advisor to several local and national organizations and continuing to serve her alma mater as trustee emerita. In 1982, the All-Pennsylvania College Alumni Association named Helen Wise an Outstanding Alumna. Penn State recognized her as an Alumni Fellow of the College of Education in 1987, and in 1990 the Lion's Paw Alumni Association awarded her its coveted Lion's Paw Medal for promoting the welfare of her alma mater and perpetuating its traditions. Wise retired in 1995 after serving eight years on Governor Robert P. Casey's staff as secretary for legislative affairs, secretary to the Cabinet, and deputy chief of staff for programs.

References

Democratic Party members of the Pennsylvania House of Representatives
Women state legislators in Pennsylvania
Living people
1928 births
Penn State College of Education alumni
21st-century American women